The 1966 Belgian Grand Prix was a Formula One motor race held at Spa-Francorchamps on 12 June 1966. It was race 2 of 9 in both the 1966 World Championship of Drivers and the 1966 International Cup for Formula One Manufacturers. The race was the 26th Belgian Grand Prix and was held over 28 laps of the 14.1-kilometre circuit for a race distance of 395 kilometres.

The race was won by British driver and 1964 world champion, John Surtees, driving a Ferrari 312 in a race that saw the field decimated by weather in the early laps. It was Surtees' fourth Grand Prix victory and his first since the 1964 Italian Grand Prix. Surtees won by 42 seconds over Austrian driver Jochen Rindt driving a Cooper T81, Rindt achieving his first podium finish and the first for the new Cooper-Maserati combination as the works Cooper Car Company team looked to the three-litre Maserati V12 sports car engine for the new regulations. Surtees' Italian team mate Lorenzo Bandini finished third in his Ferrari 246.

With a pair of podiums, Bandini took the lead in the championship by a point over the two race winners, Surtees and Jackie Stewart.

Race summary
The race distance was shortened from the previous year, from 32 to 28 laps. More than half the field crashed out on the first lap due to a heavy rainstorm and only seven runners remained by the start of the second lap. Four drivers went off and crashed at the sweeping Burnenville corner, where the heavy wall of rain was. Jo Bonnier crashed with his Cooper T81 coming to rest balancing on a parapet, the front half car in the air. Jackie Stewart's BRM P261 crashed into a telephone pole and then landed in a ditch at Masta Kink, leading to him being stuck upside down in his BRM, halfway up to his waist in fuel, for 25 minutes. Graham Hill and Bob Bondurant, both of whom had gone off near Stewart, managed to rescue him with a spectator's toolkit. Jack Brabham slid his Brabham BT19 coming out of the Masta Kink at 135 mph, but regained control of the car and rejoined the race. There was so much water on the track that it got into and flooded the Climax engine in Jim Clark's Lotus 33, putting him out on the first lap too. The entire first lap was run under green flags.

The race was filmed for the motion picture Grand Prix. The eight-minute segment of the 1966 film uses a combination of live footage and mocked-up racing scenes. The live footage shows Surtees, Bonnier, Bandini, Ligier, Clark and Gurney in action. Surtees doubles in the scene for the fictional Jean-Pierre Sarti while Bandini doubles for the fictional Nino Barlini. The film is careful not to pick up Jackie Stewart in action as he doubles for the fictional character Scott Stoddard, who at this point in the film is recovering from a near fatal crash earlier in the season, although this was fairly easy since Stewart crashed on the first lap. James Garner's white "Yamura", a repainted McLaren, did not appear in the actual race and scenes showing it are part of the staged race filming.

Because of McLaren's withdrawal, Bob Bondurant's car had to be painted white overnight in order to have actual footage featuring the "Yamura" car. In addition, Phil Hill was allowed to do one lap of the track with his car having a camera mounted on its nose. He managed to avoid the entire first-lap carnage and was able to get pictures of the scene.

After his accident in this race, Jackie Stewart began his efforts for safer racing which continued for decades; particularly after his influence as a Formula One racing driver grew through the next seven seasons he competed in the sport.

Classification

Qualifying 

 Bondurant drove car #8 in practice alongside Wilson, but he would drive car #24 in the race.

Race

Championship standings after the race

Drivers' Championship standings

Constructors' Championship standings

 Notes: Only the top five positions are included for both sets of standings.

References

External links
 

Belgian Grand Prix
Belgian Grand Prix
Grand Prix
June 1966 sports events in Europe